Tiangongyuan Subdistrict is a subdistrict situated in the northwestern portion of Daxing District, Beijing, China. It borders Linxiao Road and Guanyinsi Subdistricts to its north, Huangcun and Weishanzhuang Towns to its east, Lugezhuang Town to its south, and Beizangcun Town to its west. As of 2020, the census had counted 87,415 residents within the subdistrict.

This region used to be  Shijiazhuang Village. According to Wanshu Zaji, Emperor Zhangzong of Jin stayed within the village during his hunting trip, and since then the area was renamed to Tiangongyuan. The subdistrict had been part of Beizangcun Town for decades, and was formally created in 2009.

Administrative divisions 
So far in 2021, Tiangongyuan Subdistrict is formed from 18 communities that are listed below:

See also 

 List of township-level divisions of Beijing

References 

Daxing District
Subdistricts of Beijing